Dwi Lestari Pramesti "Mesty" Ariotedjo (born April 25, 1989) is an Indonesian medical doctor, Mesty Ariotedjo is the youngest member of World Economic Forum 2014 from Indonesia. She was the only representative and speaker at International Non Communicable Diseases (NCD) Children Conference, Port of Spain, Trinidad and Tobago, from Indonesia. She is also a member of Global Shapers Jakarta.

Early life
Ariotedjo was born in Jakarta. Her father, Arie Ariotedjo, works as a business executive in a various companies. Her mother, Arti Ariotedjo (née Prawirakusumah), is a socialite and a housewife. Her grandfather, Sri Bima Ariotedjo, was the Indonesian Ambassador to the Philippines during President Soeharto's presidency.

Ariotedjo was raised as a Muslim. She has Javanese ancestry from her father and Sundanese from her mother. Ariotedjo graduated from SMA Negeri 8 Jakarta in 2007. In 2012, she graduated from Faculty of Medicine, University of Indonesia.

References

External links
Official site

1989 births
Living people
People from Jakarta
Indonesian female models
Indonesian harpists
Indonesian musicians
Javanese people
Sundanese people
Indonesian Muslims
SMA Negeri 8 Jakarta alumni
University of Indonesia alumni